Elayne Brenzinger (born 1951, in Scotland) was a Member of the Legislative Assembly of the Province of British Columbia, serving as a member of the British Columbia Liberal Party from 2001-2005. She was a key figure in the formation of the Democratic Reform British Columbia Party and was its first MLA.

Career 
She was first elected to the Legislative Assembly as a member of the British Columbia Liberal Party in the 2001 provincial election for the riding of Surrey-Whalley. Brenzinger defeated cabinet minister and long time NDP MLA, Joan Smallwood, winning 45.73 percent of the vote. Aside from Brenzinger's term in office, Surrey-Whalley has been a predominantly NDP riding.

She resigned from the Liberal caucus to sit as an independent in March 2004 because of a dispute with the party leadership, including over concerns with the sale of BC Rail to CN. She claimed then-premiere and party leader Gordon Campbell humiliated her at a caucus meeting in 2003, cursing and yelling at her.

In March 2004, following her departure from the party, she made public allegations of improper conduct against liberal MLA Richard Stewart, claiming he had groped her at a night club in Victoria. Stewart was suspended from office, though Brenzinger later retracted the allegations and issued a formal apology. Stewart retracted his defamation lawsuit after the apology.  
  
She was a key force in the creation of the Democratic Reform BC party, which was officially founded on January 15, 2005, and became its first MLA four days later.

On May 17, 2005, Brenzinger was defeated by New Democratic candidate Bruce Ralston in her Surrey-Whalley riding.

Election results 

|-

|-

|NDP
|Joan Smallwood
|align="right"|4,536
|align="right"|30.99%
|align="right"|
|align="right"|$42,735

|}

References

External links
 Brenzinger's official bio

1951 births
Living people
Scottish emigrants to Canada
British Columbia Liberal Party MLAs
Women MLAs in British Columbia
Democratic Reform British Columbia MLAs
People from Surrey, British Columbia
21st-century Canadian politicians
21st-century Canadian women politicians